The Jewett-Thompson House is a historic house located at 1141 Wales Drive in Fort Myers, Florida.

Description and history 
On September 29, 1988, it was added to the National Register of Historic Places.

References

External links

 Lee County listings at National Register of Historic Places
 Lee County listings at Florida's Office of Cultural and Historical Programs

Houses on the National Register of Historic Places in Florida
National Register of Historic Places in Lee County, Florida
Houses in Lee County, Florida
Buildings and structures in Fort Myers, Florida
Houses completed in 1926